The Kavli Institute for Theoretical Physics (KITP) is a research institute of the University of California, Santa Barbara. KITP is one of the most renowned institutes for theoretical physics in the world, and brings theorists in physics and related fields together to work on topics at the forefront of theoretical science. The National Science Foundation has been the principal supporter of the institute since it was founded as the Institute for Theoretical Physics in 1979. In a 2007 article in the Proceedings of the National Academy of Sciences, KITP was given the highest impact index in a comparison of nonbiomedical research organizations across the U.S.

About 
In the early 2000s, the institute, formerly known as the Institute for Theoretical Physics, or ITP, was named for the Norwegian-American physicist and businessman Fred Kavli, in recognition of his donation of $7.5 million to the institute.

Kohn Hall, which houses KITP, is located just beyond the Henley Gate at the East Entrance of the UCSB campus. The building was designed by the Driehaus Prize winner and New Classical architect Michael Graves, and a new wing designed by Graves was added in 2003–2004.

Members 
The directors of the KITP since its beginning have been:

 Walter Kohn, 1979–1984 (Nobel Prize in Chemistry, 1998)
 Robert Schrieffer, 1984–1989 (Nobel Prize for Physics, 1972)
 James S. Langer, 1989–1995 (Oliver Buckley Prize (APS), 1997)
 James Hartle, 1995–1997 (Einstein Prize (APS), 2009)
 David Gross, 1997–2012 (Nobel Prize in Physics, 2004)
 Lars Bildsten, 2012–present (Helen B. Warner Prize (AAS), 1999; Dannie Heineman Prize for Astrophysics (AAS & American Institute of Physics), 2017)

The Director, Deputy Director Mark Bowick, and Permanent Members of the KITP (Leon Balents, Lars Bildsten, David Gross, and Boris Shraiman) are also on the faculty of the UC Santa Barbara Physics Department. Former Permanent Members include Joseph Polchinski and Physics Nobel laureate Frank Wilczek.

References

External links
 The KITP web site

University of California, Santa Barbara
Research institutes in California
Physics institutes
Michael Graves buildings
Kavli Institutes
Theoretical physics institutes
New Classical architecture